Arthromyces is a genus of fungi in the Lyophyllaceae family. The genus contain two species found in Central America.

See also

References

External links

Agaricales genera